Chen Xuedong (born 28 June 1990), also known as Cheney Chen, is a Chinese actor and singer.  He is best known for his role as Zhou Chongguang in the film series Tiny Times (2013–2015).

Career

Predebut 
Chen was born in Wenzhou, Zhejiang. He worked as a part-time model at the age of 17. He later graduated from the Shanghai Conservatory of Music with a degree in musical drama. Prior to his debut as an actor, Chen trained to be a singer at Cube Entertainment in Korea and was selected to be in the lineup for BTOB. In 2012, he began filming his first acting role in Tiny Times.

2013–2015: Tiny Times and Rising popularity 
Chen made his big screen debut in the first installment of Tiny Times, directed by Guo Jingming. The film was a huge commercial success and broke various film records in China. Thereafter, he starred in the subsequent installments of the film series from 2013 to 2015. Tiny Times became a hugely successful movie franchise in China, and propelled Chen into fame.

In 2014, Chen also joined Hunan TV's variety show Grade One where he assumed the role of a temporary homeroom teacher. The same year, Chen starred in his first comedy film, Bad Sister where he acted as a barista.

In 2015, Chen was announced to be the Chinese dub for Paddington Bear in the comedy film, Paddington. The same year, he starred in the comedy film Oh My God, produced by Zhang Ziyi.

2016–present: Mainstream success 
In 2016, Chen starred in the youth fashion drama Yes! Mr. Fashion. This marks his first small-screen leading role. The same year, he starred in spy drama, Decoded where he played the role of an autistic mathematical genius. Decoded was a commercial success, and Chen won the Best On-screen Performance award with Ying Er at the China TV Drama Awards.

Chen reunited with Tiny Times director Guo in the fantasy blockbuster L.O.R.D: Legend of Ravaging Dynasties. The same year, he starred in Zhang Yimou's historical film The Great Wall.

In 2017, he made his walkway debut at the Dolce & Gabbana Fall runway for the Milan Fashion Week in January. In June, he starred in the youth melodrama Rush to the Dead Summer. 
The same year he starred in the caper film The Big Call, the first Chinese movie to focus on telecommunications fraud. Chen ranked 40th on Forbes China Celebrity 100 list in 2017.

In 2018, Chen starred in the wuxia film Kung Fu Monster. The same year, he was cast in the youth musical drama So Young.

Philanthropy 
On 29 August 2013, Chen participated a welfare community programme named "Transparent Love". On 27 May 2017, he became a goodwill ambassador for a foundation which helps autistic children in China. On 9 September 2017, Chen attended the 2017 Harpers Bazaar Star Charity Night and donated 10 ambulances, which were worth 700 thousand yuan (RMB).

Filmography

Film

Television series

Variety show

Discography

Awards and nominations

References

External links 
 Chen Xuedong on Sina Weibo
 Chen Xuedong on Internet Movie Database

21st-century Chinese male actors
1990 births
Living people
Chinese male film actors
Chinese male television actors
Musicians from Wenzhou
Male actors from Wenzhou
Shanghai Conservatory of Music alumni
21st-century Chinese male singers
Singers from Zhejiang